"Early in the Morning" is a song written by Bobby Darin and Woody Harris.

Background
Darin brought the song to Brunswick Records, but as he was under contract with Atco Records, a subsidiary of Atlantic Records, Brunswick released a recording of it crediting the "Ding Dongs". New York disc jockeys liked the record, and Atco soon discovered the deception. Brunswick was forced to turn over the masters to Atco, which released the record in 1958, crediting the "Rinky Dinks".

Cover version
A version by Buddy Holly, quickly released by Brunswick (as Coral Records 9-62006), competed in the UK (Coral Q 72333) with Darin's single (London 45-HL-E.8679, crediting the Rinky-Dinks); future releases were issued under Darin's name.

Chart performance
The recording credited to the "Rinky Dinks" peaked at #24 on the pop chart and #8 on the Most Played R&B by Jockeys chart.
The Buddy Holly recording peaked at #32 on the Billboard Hot 100.

References

1958 songs
1958 singles
Bobby Darin songs
Buddy Holly songs
Songs written by Woody Harris
Songs written by Bobby Darin
Coral Records singles
Atco Records singles